John Christodoulou   is an Australian medical geneticist, genetic pathologist and clinical scientist. He is director of the Genetics Theme and Group Co-Leader of the Brain and Mitochondrial Research Group at Murdoch Children's Research Institute. Additionally, he holds the Chair in Genomic Medicine, Department of Paediatrics, The University of Melbourne.

Career
After studying medicine at the University of Sydney, Christodoulou undertook his medical internship at Westmead Hospital. He subsequently trained in paediatrics at the Royal Alexandra Children's Hospital, before moving to Melbourne to undertake his PhD into birth defects. In 1990, Christodoulou then moved to Toronto to train in metabolic medicine, before moving back to Sydney to take up consultant positions at a number of hospitals across Sydney. In January 2016 he relocated from Sydney, and took up the inaugural Chair of Genomic Medicine at the Murdoch Children's Research Institute and the University of Melbourne.

Publications

Journal articles

Google Scholar lists over 420 documents by Christodoulou, which have been cited in excess of 17,000 times, and calculates his h-index as 68.

Book chapters

Christodoulou, J., Williamson, S., Ellaway, C. (2005). Rett Syndrome. In Jurgen Fuchs & Maurizio Podda (Eds.), Encyclopedia of Medical Genomics and Proteomics, (pp. 1–7). Europe: Marcel Dekker. 
Christodoulou, J., Wilcken, B. (2004). Biochemical Genetic Emergencies. In Henry Kilham & David Isaacs (Eds.), The Children's Hospital at Westmead Handbook: Clinical practice guidelines for paediatrics, (pp. 104–111). Sydney: McGraw-Hill Education. 
Christodoulou, J. (2003). Genetic metabolic disorders. In Kenneth P. Nunn, Cybele Dey (Eds.), The Clinicians Guide to Psychotropic Prescribing Children and Adolescents, (pp. 332–346). Australia: Child and Adolescent Mental Health Statewide Network. 
Christodoulou, J. (2002). A clinical approach to inborn errors of metabolism. In Rudolph AM, Kamei RK, Overby KJ (Eds.), Rudolph's Fundamentals of Pediatrics, (pp. 221–252). United Kingdom: McGraw-Hill Education. 
Christodoulou, J., Barlow, R. (2001). It's all in our genes. In Kim Oates, Kathryn Currow & Wendy Hu (Eds.), Child Health: A Practical Manual for General Practice, (pp. 37–46). Australia: MacLennan & Petty.

Service to professional organisations
Professor Christodoulou has served as a leader of medical and research genetics on a National level. Christodoulou is a former President of the Human Genetics Society of Australasia (2005-2007), and member of the Human Genetics Advisory Committee (2009-2015).

Recognition
 National Health and Medical Research Council of Australia Postgraduate Medical Research Fellowship -1987-1990. 
 American Society of Human Genetics Postdoctoral Clinical Research Student Award, 1992. 
 Vice-Chancellor's Award for Excellence in Postgraduate Research Higher Degree Supervision, 2004. 
 Member, Order of Australia (AM), 2010 Australia Day Honours. Awarded in recognition of my contributions to genetic practice and research, particularly in the area of genetic metabolic disorders.
 Ippokratis Award for outstanding achievement by a medical professional. Awarded by the Australasian Hellenic Educational Progressive Association (AHEPA), 2010
 Human Genetics Society of Australasia Sutherland Lecturer, 2010
 Elected as Fellow of the Australian Academy of Health and Medical Sciences, elected 2017

References

Further reading
Christodoulou J. (2013). Curriculum vitae

Living people
University of Melbourne alumni
University of Sydney alumni
Academic staff of the University of Melbourne
Fellows of the Royal Australasian College of Physicians
Medical geneticists
Geneticists
Human geneticists
Australian clinical geneticists
Members of the Order of Australia
Fellows of the Australian Academy of Health and Medical Sciences
Australian medical researchers
Year of birth missing (living people)